The Martin family is a fictional family on the popular ABC daytime soap opera, All My Children.

The Martin family have been the cornerstone of Pine Valley since All My Children’s inception in 1970. Even before Joe Martin married Ruth Martin, Kate Martin was a symbol of stability and strong family values. Nowadays, Joe spends his days balancing his work as a doctor, and the tumultuous love lives of his many children and grandchildren.
As of 2009, Joe and Ruth Martin have since retired and moved to Florida.

Descendants

Henry Martin (deceased); married Kate Martin (dissolved)
Joe Martin; Henry and Kate's son; married Helen Martin (widowed), Ruth Parker (1972–) 
Jeff Martin; Joe and Helen's son; married Erica Kane (1971–74), Mary Kennicott (1974), Chris Karrass (1978–2006)
Joshua "Josh" Madden (1980–2009); Jeff and Erica's son 
Tara Martin; Joe and Helen's daughter; married Chuck Tyler (1972–75), Phillip Brent (1976–81), Jim Jefferson (1981) 
Charlie Brent (1972–); Tara and Phillip's son; married Cecily Davidson (1995–) 
Nick Brent (1995–); Charlie and Cecily's son 
Philip Joseph Brent, II (2000–); Charlie and Cecily's son
Kelsey Jefferson (1985–); Tara and Jim's daughter; married Bobby Warner (1996–97) 
Sam Grey (1990–); Kelsey and Bobby's son
Bobby Martin; Joe and Helen's son (who went to the attic in search of his skis and has never been seen or missed since)
Tad Martin; Joe and Ruth's adopted son; married Dottie Thornton (1984–85), Hillary Wilson (1986), Dixie Cooney (1989–90, 1994–96, 1999–2002), Brooke English (1993–94), Krystal Carey (2007–09)  
Damon Miller; Tad and Hillary's son
Jamie Martin (1984–); Tad and Brooke's son
Kathy Martin (2002–); Tad and Dixie's daughter 
Jennifer Colby Martin (2007–); Tad and Krystal's daughter
Jake Martin (1979–); Joe and Ruth's son; married Emily Ann Sago (1990–91), Gillian Andrassy (2000–01), Dr. Carolyn Finn (2003–08), Amanda Dillon (2009–) 
Trevor Martin (2009–); Jake and Amanda's son 
Paul Martin; Henry and Kate's son; married Anne Tyler (1972–74, 1976–81), Margo Flax (1974–76)
Beth Martin (1976–77); Paul and Anne's daughter

Family tree

External links
 Martin family at soapcentral.'''com|AMC Online

All My Children characters
All My Children families